Druid Hills High School is a high school operated by the DeKalb County School District. It is located at 1798 Haygood Drive, in the Druid Hills CDP in unincorporated DeKalb County, Georgia, United States. It serves the Druid Hills CDP, the North Druid Hills CDP, and the North Decatur CDP.

School characteristics

Academics
Several levels of academics are offered at Druid Hills. From least to greatest difficulty, the course types available are online/DOLA, general, accelerated/honors/gifted, Advanced Placement, and International Baccalaureate classes. Dual enrollment options are also offered. All classes are in accordance with Georgia Performance Standards and students must take state-administered End of Course Tests (EOCTs), unless otherwise exempt. Graduates often enroll as first-year undergraduate students at the University of Georgia, Georgia Institute of Technology, and Georgia State University.

Druid Hills has had IB accreditation since 2004 as an IB World School, however, AP classes generally are more populated than their IB counterparts. Roughly 10% of the student body enrolls in the IB Diploma Programme, often with less than 50 IB students per grade.

Enrollment
Enrollment for the 2009–2010 school year was 1,421 students in grades 9-12. A later population size indicated was 1,459.

Accreditation
On December 17, 2012, the Southern Association of Colleges and Schools announced that it had downgraded the DeKalb County Schools System's status from "on advisement" to "on probation" and warned the school system that the loss of their accreditation was "imminent." Partially in an attempt to distance Druid Hills from the danger of disaccreditation and county mismanagement, parents and other contributors of Druid Hills High School began a petition to form a public charter cluster of five elementary schools, one middle school, and one high school. This included Druid Hills High School, Avondale Elementary, Briar Vista Elementary, Fernbank Elementary, Laurel Ridge Elementary, McLendon Elementary, and Druid Hills Middle School. The charter cluster would have granted some autonomy to the schools as a group while still remaining part of the DeKalb County School District.  However, this charter was turned down by the Dekalb School Board on November 11, 2013 with a 5–4 vote against it, which was a final and non-appealable decision.

School Lockdown Incident 
At 10:30 AM on May 5th 2022 students at DHHS informed their principal that they believed a fellow classmate had brought a gun to school. The principle then informed the school resource officer, locking down the school while police searched for the student and the weapon. The lockdown was ended around noon when police decided that the student had likely escaped to the area around the school, the student was later apprehended on the Emory University campus just before 4 PM that day.

School Conditions Scandal
In early 2022, a group of DHHS students and parents posted a video showing various health and safety issues.The DeKalb County School Board voted against modernizing the school, leading to student protests. On April 25th the state superintendent sent a letter ordering the school board to take action to repair the school. On May 31st, 2022 the DeKalb County School Board voted 7-0 to restore Druid Hills High School at a proposed funding level of $50 million.

Feeder schools 
Druid hills is fed into by the following Elementary Schools:

 Briar Vista Elementary School
 Fernbank Elementary School
 Laurel Ridge Elementary School
 McLendon Elementary School
 Avondale Elementary School

Druid Hills Middle School, formerly known as Shamrock Middle School, is Druid Hills' only feeder middle school.

Notable alumni
 Josh Arieh, World Series of Poker champion
 Gayle Barron, distance runner
 Ron Blomberg, Major League Baseball player
 Brenda Boozer, Opera singer
 Hermann Flaschka, mathematician
 Sam Massell, former mayor of Atlanta
 Ray Stevens, recording artist
 Herman Talmadge, former Georgia Governor and Georgia Senator
 Alfred Uhry, playwright

References

External links
 Official website

Educational institutions established in 1919
DeKalb County School District high schools
Druid Hills, Georgia
1919 establishments in Georgia (U.S. state)